There have been two baronetcies created for persons with the surname Howard, both in the Baronetage of the United Kingdom. One creation is extinct while the other is extant.

The Howard Baronetcy, of Bushey Park in the County Wicklow, was created in the Baronetage of the United Kingdom on 26 July 1838 for Ralph Howard, Member of Parliament for County Wicklow. He was the son of the Hon. Hugh Howard, younger son of Ralph Howard, 1st Viscount Wicklow (see Earl of Wicklow for earlier history of the family). The title became extinct on his death in 1873.

The Howard Baronetcy, of Great Rissington in the County of Gloucester, was created in the Baronetage of the United Kingdom on 1 December 1955 for Sir Seymour Howard, Lord Mayor of London in 1954. His eldest son, the second Baronet, was Lord Mayor of London in 1971. As of 2010 the title is held by the latter's eldest son, the third Baronet, who succeeded in 2001. He was Lord Mayor of London in 2000.

Howard baronets, of Bushey Park (1838)

Sir Ralph Howard, 1st Baronet (1801–1873)

Howard baronets, of Great Rissington (1955)
Sir (Harold Walter) Seymour Howard, 1st Baronet (1888–1967)
Sir Hamilton Edward de Coucey Howard, 2nd Baronet (1915–2001)
Sir David Howarth Seymour Howard, 3rd Baronet (born 1945)

The heir apparent is the current Baronet's eldest son.

See also
Earl of Wicklow

Notes

References
Kidd, Charles, Williamson, David (editors). Debrett's Peerage and Baronetage (1990 edition). New York: St Martin's Press, 1990, 

Baronetcies in the Baronetage of the United Kingdom
Extinct baronetcies in the Baronetage of the United Kingdom
Recipients of the Order of Independence (Jordan)